This is a list of consumer organizations.

International
 ANEC
 Consumers International
 International Consumer Research & Testing

Botswana 
 Consumer Watchdog (Botswana)

Chile
 Chile - Asociación de Consumidores y Usuarios "Orcus"

Germany
 Federal Office of Consumer Protection and Food Safety
 Stiftung Warentest

Hong Kong 
 Consumer Council (Hong Kong) - also publisher of the Choice magazine

Myanmar 
 Consumer Protection Association

New Zealand 
 Consumer NZ - publisher of New Zealand's Consumer magazine.

Pakistan
 Competition Commission of Pakistan
 The Consumers Eye Pakistan (TCEP)
(QSA) - Organizer of Quality Standard Award Pakistan .
 Consumer Voice Pakistan (CVP)
(CVM) - publisher of Consumer Voice magazine.

Portugal 
 Associação Portuguesa para a Defesa do Consumidor (DECO) - publisher of PRO TESTE magazine.
 Autoridade da Concorrência

Uganda 
 Uganda Consumer Action Network (U-CAN)

United Kingdom 
 Campaign for Real Ale (CAMRA)
 Consumers' Association - publisher of Which?
 Energywatch
 Financial Services Authority
 Transport Focus

United States 
 AARP
 Alliance for Affordable Services
 American Automobile Association
 American Coalition of Citizens with Disabilities
 Association of Community Organizations for Reform Now (ACORN)
 Consumer Action
 Consumer Federation of America
 Consumer Reports
 Consumer Watchdog
 FlyersRights.org
 Funeral Consumers Alliance
 National Consumer Law Center (NCLC)
 National Consumers League
 National Council Against Health Fraud
 Organic Consumers Association
 Public Citizen
 Public Interest Research Group (PIRG)
 Quackwatch
 TURN (The Utility Reform Network)
 Underwriters Laboratories

References

Consumer